Hassi Bahbah District is a district of Djelfa Province, Algeria.

Municipalities
The district is further divided into 4 municipalities:

Hassi Bahbah
Zaafrane
Hassi El Euch
Aïn Maabed

Districts of Djelfa Province